Hubert Aufschnaiter (born 7 June 1963) is an Austrian retired Paralympic shooter who competed at international shooting sports competitions. He has competed at the Paralympic Games seven times consecutively and has won seven medals.

References

1963 births
Living people
Paralympic shooters of Austria
Austrian male sport shooters
Shooters at the 1988 Summer Paralympics
Shooters at the 1992 Summer Paralympics
Shooters at the 1996 Summer Paralympics
Shooters at the 2000 Summer Paralympics
Shooters at the 2004 Summer Paralympics
Shooters at the 2008 Summer Paralympics
Shooters at the 2012 Summer Paralympics
Medalists at the 1988 Summer Paralympics
Medalists at the 1992 Summer Paralympics
Medalists at the 1996 Summer Paralympics
Medalists at the 2000 Summer Paralympics
Medalists at the 2004 Summer Paralympics
20th-century Austrian people
21st-century Austrian people